Natalia Barbu (born 22 August 1979) is a Moldovan singer and songwriter. She is best known for representing Moldova in the Eurovision Song Contest 2007 with the song "Fight".

Music career 
Throughout her career, Natalia has worked with a group of musicians called Trigon on an alternative jazz-folk experiment. She writes her own lyrics, composes the music for most of her songs, and collaborates on the arrangements with her crew.

In 2006, Natalia Barbu signed a three-year contract with Cat Music Records (Sony Music) office in Bucharest.

Her main success has been the release of her single "Îngerul meu" (My Angel) in Romania. The song remained in the Romanian Top 100 for 11 weeks at No.1, and was much featured on MTV Romania.

On 14 December 2006, Barbu was selected to represent Moldova at the Eurovision Song Contest 2007 with the song "Fight". At the contest, she qualified from the semi-final on 10 May 2007 and ultimately placed 10th in the final on 12 May 2007, scoring 109 points.

In 2012, she began collaboration with musical producer Radu Sirbu and songwriter Ana Sirbu (Sianna) under the label Rassada Music. At the end of the summer Natalia premiered her new track, "I Said It's Sad", which she says is a major style change for her. The new song reached No. 1 position in Top 10 Airplay Moldova. Later in 2012, she released "Iubire Cu Aroma De Cafea", and "Confession", which participated at the Romanian national selection for Eurovision Song Contest 2013.

Personal life
In 2011, Barbu married a Romanian millionaire and currently lives with him in Romania.

Discography
Între ieri şi azi (Between Yesterday And Today) (2001)
Zbor De Dor (2003)
Eurovision Song Contest – Helsinki 2007 (2007)
Fight – 2007
I Said it's Sad (2012)

References

Interview
Natalia gave an interview for Wikipedia:

External links

Natalia Barbu's official page on Youtube
Natalia Barbu's personal page on Youtube (no activity since 2011)
Official website 
Interview by Ludmila Mamaliga
Natalia Barbu not participating again (in ESC 2008) because of cost

1979 births
Romanian people of Moldovan descent
Living people
Eurovision Song Contest entrants of 2007
Eurovision Song Contest entrants for Moldova
Moldovan emigrants to Romania
21st-century Moldovan women singers
English-language singers from Moldova
People from Bălți